Villers-Saint-Sépulcre is a commune in the Oise department in northern France. Villers-Saint-Sépulcre station has rail connections to Beauvais and Creil.

See also
 Communes of the Oise department

References

Communes of Oise